Altia-ABM is a provider of software for the law enforcement, investigation and intelligence sectors around the world.  The company is headquartered in Nottingham, United Kingdom.

Areas of business
Altia-ABM specialises in the development of intelligence and investigative software for managing both overt and covert operations across law enforcement, counter terrorism agencies and commercial organisations.  The company provides solutions to clients across the globe, including the United Kingdom, Australia, United States and Canada.  Approximately 80% of UK police forces use Altia-ABM intelligence software and Altia-ABM the national intelligence system across Scotland, the Scottish Intelligence Database.

History
The original company was formed in 1992 to deliver overt based software to law enforcement organisations in the UK.  The company was then bought by ZEDA Limited in 1997 to combine the overt with covert products, such as informant management and covert operation.  The company changed its name to ABM in 1998 and now provides software to law enforcement, security agencies and large commercial organisations that require investigative management to counter fraud, counterfeiting and smuggling operations.

Acquisition
It was acquired by Altia Solutions in September 2016 for an undisclosed sum and is now its subsidiary.

See also
 Scottish Intelligence Database, UK

References
Altia-ABM profile

External links
Altia-ABM website

Companies based in Nottingham
British companies established in 1992
Software companies of the United Kingdom